RSP may refer to:

Music
 RSP (band), a Japanese hip-hop and R&B group
 Rubber Soul Project, a Serbian rock music band

Business
 Recognised Safety Professional, a designation awarded by the International Institute of Risk & Safety Management
 Rourkela Steel Plant, one of the largest steel plants in India

Technology
 Retail Service Provider, an end-user supplier for the Australian National Broadband Network
 Role Swap Protocol, a communication protocol used internally by the USB On-The-Go standard
 Remote SIM provisioning, in mobile phone technology

Transportation
 Rail Settlement Plan, provider of revenue allocation and support services to Britain's Train Operating Companies
 Rail Sim Pro, a rail simulator by Auran Software
 Recruit Sustainment Program, program of the United States National Guard

Companies
 Rising Sun Pictures, an Australian visual effects service provider
 Rogers Sportsnet Pacific, Canadian sports channel

Other uses
 Rana Sura Padakkama, a military decoration of Sri Lanka
 Receiving stolen property, a crime in which an individual has possession of stolen goods
 Progressive Social Networks (Spanish: Redes Sociales Progresistas), a political party in Mexico
 Reform Socialist Party, a small socialist party in Italy
 Repositories Support Project, a project that supports development of UK-based repositories
 Reservestridsproviant, a canned food made for the Norwegian Army
 Resource Specialist Program, a category of special education program in some US schools
 Respirable suspended particle, particles of 10 micrometres or less
 Respiratory syncytial virus, a human pathogen causing cold- or flu-like disease
 Revolutionary Socialist Party (disambiguation)
 Riverfront State Prison in Camden, New Jersey
 Retirement Savings Plan, Canadian account for holding savings and retirement assets